Al-Midhatiya Sport Club, is an Iraqi football team based in Babil, that plays in the Iraq Division Two.

Managerial history
 Hassan Hadi

See also
 2002–03 Iraq FA Cup

References

External links
 Al-Midhatiya SC on Goalzz.com
 Iraq Clubs- Foundation Dates

Football clubs in Babil